Robert Arthur Newton (19 January 1946 – 25 October 2009) was an English professional footballer who played as a winger.

Career
Born in Earl Shilton, Newton began his career with Leicester City. He joined Bradford City in May 1965. He made 20 league appearances for the club, scoring 4 goals, also made one FA Cup and one Football League Cup appearance. He was released by the club in 1966. He later played for Wellington Town, Tamworth, Nuneaton Borough and Worcester City.

Sources

References

1946 births
2009 deaths
English footballers
Leicester City F.C. players
Bradford City A.F.C. players
Telford United F.C. players
Tamworth F.C. players
Nuneaton Borough F.C. players
Worcester City F.C. players
English Football League players
Association football wingers